Horace Silver and the Jazz Messengers is a 1956 repackage of 1955 10” LPs by jazz pianist Horace Silver with drummer Art Blakey and featuring Hank Mobley on tenor saxophone, Kenny Dorham on trumpet, and Doug Watkins on bass. By the time this repackage was released, this quintet had named themselves the Jazz Messengers, and the band name on the label reflected that.  These recordings helped establish the hard bop style. Scott Yanow on Allmusic describes it as "a true classic". Originally released as an LP, the album has subsequently been reissued on CD several times.

Background
Horace Silver and the Jazz Messengers was the first 12" Blue Note album released under Silver’s name. The album is a reissue of two previous 10" LPs -- Horace Silver Quintet (BLP 5058) and Horace Silver Quintet, Vol. 2 (BLP 5062) -- and the first sessions in which he used the quintet format which he would largely use for the rest of his career. The music on the album mixes bebop influences with blues and gospel feels.

One of the most successful tunes from the album, "The Preacher", was almost rejected for recording by producer Alfred Lion, who thought it was "too old-timey", but reinstated at the insistence of Blakey and Silver, who threatened to cancel the session until he had written another tune to record in its place if it wasn’t included.  According to Silver, the track showed that the band could "reach way back and get that old time, gutbucket barroom feeling with just a taste of the back-beat".

Track listing

(*) Originally released on 10" LP Horace Silver Quintet, Volume 3 (BLP 5058)
(**) Originally released on 10" LP Horace Silver Quintet Vol. 4 (BLP 5062)

Personnel

Performance
 Horace Silver - piano
 Kenny Dorham - trumpet
 Hank Mobley - tenor saxophone
 Doug Watkins - bass
 Art Blakey - drums

Production
 Alfred Lion - production
 Reid Miles - design
 Rudy Van Gelder - engineering
 Francis Wolff - photography

References

1956 compilation albums
Horace Silver albums
The Jazz Messengers albums
Albums produced by Alfred Lion
Blue Note Records albums